A Sveticism is a grammatical construction, loanword or calque originating from the Swedish language.

Sveticisms are particularly found in the Finnish language, because Finland's governing bureaucracy was mostly Swedish-speaking until the 20th century. The use of Swedish grammatical constructions in official speech is a particularly persistent habit. The Swedish  future tense is an example, being translated to  + third infinitive in illative case, e.g.  < Swedish  'the house will be built'. The language regulator recommends against such usage in official speech.

Sveticisms are also common in Norwegian.

Sveticisms in English are loanwords, such as smörgåsbord, ombudsman, tungsten, orienteering, moped and running the gauntlet (reinterpretation of Swedish ).

References

Swedish language